The Veig is a river in the municipalities of Eidfjord and Ullensvang in Vestland county, Norway.

The river rises east of Hårteigen, a mountain in the central part of the Hardanger Plateau. It runs to the north and empties into Lake Eidfjord. It then flows through the Hjølmo Valley (Hjølmadalen) before reaching Lake Eidfjord. In 1981 the river system was protected against development for hydroelectric power in connection with the creation of Hardanger Plateau National Park.

References

Rivers of Vestland
Eidfjord
Ullensvang
Rivers of Norway